Samuel Emanuel Studer (1757–1834) was a Swiss malacologist. He named various taxa of molluscs including:
 The land snail genus Pomatias Studer, 1789

Works
Studer, S. 1820. Kurzes Verzeichniss der bis jetzt in unserm Vaterlande entdeckten Conchylien. Naturwissenschaftlicher Anzeiger der Allgemeinen Schweizerischen Gesellschaft für die Gesammten Naturwissenschaften 3 (11): 83-90, 91-94. Bern.
contributions to Coxe, W, 1789. Travels in Switzerland, in a series of letters to William Melmoth, Esq. In three volumes. Vol. III. - pp. I-VIII [= 1-8], I-IV [= 1-4], 1-446. London. (Cadell).

References

 2,400 years of Malacology at:

Further reading
 L. Forcart, 1957. Ipsa Studeri Conchylia. Professor Samuel Studer (1757-1834), seine Bedeutung als Naturforscher und die von ihm hinterlassene Molluskensammlung. Mitteilungen der Naturforschenden Gesellschaft in Bern (n.f.) 15: 157-210, 7 pls.

1757 births
1834 deaths
Swiss malacologists
18th-century Swiss zoologists
19th-century Swiss zoologists